The Man Who Walked Through the Wall is a 1959 West German comedy film directed by Ladislao Vajda, starring Heinz Rühmann and Nicole Courcel. It was shot at the Bavaria Studios in Munich. The film is based on the novella The Man Who Walked Through Walls by Marcel Aymé. It tells the story of a man who out of frustration discovers that he has the ability to walk through walls.

Cast
 Heinz Rühmann as Herr Buchsbaum
 Nicole Courcel as Yvonne Steiner
 Rudolf Rhomberg as Painter
 Rudolf Vogel as Fuchs
 Peter Vogel as Hirschfeld
 Hubert von Meyerinck as Pickler
 Hans Leibelt as Holtzheimer

Release
The film premiered in Germany on 14 October 1959. It was released in the United States on 16 October 1964.

See also
Mr. Peek-a-Boo (1951)

References

External links 
 

1959 films
1950s fantasy comedy films
German fantasy comedy films
West German films
1950s German-language films
Films based on short fiction
Films based on works by Marcel Aymé
Films directed by Ladislao Vajda
Remakes of French films
Supernatural comedy films
1959 comedy films
Films shot at Bavaria Studios
1950s German films